The 2000–01 season was Olympiacos's 42nd consecutive season in the Alpha Ethniki and their 75th year in existence. The club were played their 4th consecutive season in the UEFA Champions League. In the beginning of the summertime Olympiacos named Greek Takis Lemonis coach.

Squad

Competitions

Alpha Ethniki

League standings

Results summary

Results by round

Results
Match dates not available with some exceptions

Olympiacos - AEK 4-1
Olympiacos - Aris 4-1
Olympiacos - Athinaikos 1-0
Olympiacos - Ethnikos Asteras 6-0
Olympiacos - Ionikos 3-3
Olympiacos - Iraklis 3-1
Olympiacos - Kalamata 5-2
Olympiacos - OFI Crete 5-0
Olympiacos - Panachaiki 3-0
Olympiacos - Panathinaikos 1-0 (March 4, 2001)
Olympiacos - Paniliakos 2-0
Olympiacos - Panionios 2-0
Olympiacos - PAS Giannina 3-1
Olympiacos - PAOK 1-0 (March 17, 2001)
Olympiacos - Skoda Xanthi 4-1

AEK - Olympiacos 1-2
Aris - Olympiacos 2-2
Athinaikos - Olympiacos 1-5
Ethnikos Asteras - Olympiacos 0-1
Ionikos - Olympiacos 0-1
Iraklis - Olympiacos 2-1
Kalamata - Olympiacos 0-1
OFI Crete - Olympiacos 1-2
Panachaiki - Olympiacos 1-5
Panathinaikos - Olympiacos 0-0 (November 12, 2000)
Paniliakos - Olympiacos 0-4
Panionios - Olympiacos 2-1
PAOK - Olympiacos 2-4 (November 27, 2000)
PAS Giannina - Olympiacos 1-5
Skoda Xanthi - Olympiacos 0-3

Greek Cup

Match dates not available with some exceptions
Olympiacos lost the 2001 Greek Cup final to PAOK 2-4 on May 12.

Group stage
Olympiacos played its matches in Group 5.

Olympiacos - Anagennisi Karditsa 7-0
Olympiacos - Egaleo 4-1
Olympiacos - Ethnikos Asteras 5-0
Olympiacos - Patraikos 4-0
Olympiacos - Trikala 4-0

Anagennisi Karditsa - Olympiacos 0-2
Egaleo - Olympiacos 3-0
Ethnikos Asteras - Olympiacos 1-4
Patraikos - Olympiacos 1-4
Trikala - Olympiacos 3-5

Knockout rounds

UEFA Champions League

Group stage

All times at CET

UEFA Cup

Third round

All times at CET

Team kit

|

|

|

|

References

External links 
 Official Website of Olympiacos Piraeus 

Olympiacos F.C. seasons
Olympiacos F.C.
Greek football championship-winning seasons